Hypercompe bolivar is a moth of the family Erebidae first described by Charles Oberthür in 1881. It is found in Colombia.

References

bolivar
Moths described in 1881